Lusiana Conco is a comune in the province of Vicenza, Veneto region of Italy. It was formed on 20 February 2019 with the merger of the comunes of Lusiana and Conco. Lusiana Conco is located in the Sette Comuni territory.

Sources

Cities and towns in Veneto
States and territories established in 2019